Castro Station was a Caltrain station located in Mountain View, California, just south of the railroad crossing at Rengstorff Avenue. It was replaced by the newer San Antonio station, which opened  to the north in April 1999.

After boardings at Castro were cut in half by the newer station opening, Castro was closed on February 6, 2000.

References

External links

Abandoned shelter in 2007 on Google Maps Street View

Caltrain stations in Santa Clara County, California
Railway stations in Mountain View, California
Railway stations closed in 2000
Former Southern Pacific Railroad stations in California
Former Caltrain stations
2000 disestablishments in California
Demolished railway stations in the United States